Dorothy Maynard Bradley (born February 24, 1947) is an American former politician from Montana. She was elected to eight terms in the Montana House of Representatives, serving from 1971 to 1978 and 1985 to 1992. Bradley now lives in Clyde Park, Montana.

Early life and education 
Born in Madison, Wisconsin in 1947, she attended law school in Washington DC and worked for the state water court.  She also briefly taught at a small rural school next to the Northern Cheyenne Indian Reservation, was the Director of the Montana State University Water Center, and was the District Court Administrator and staff for the Gallatin County Criminal Justice Coordinating Council for seven years. She joined the American Prairie Foundation National Council in 2008.

Career 
Bradley was elected to eight terms in the Montana House of Representatives, serving from 1971 to 1978 and 1985 to 1992.  She ran for Congress in 1978, but lost in the primary to Pat Williams. When incumbent Governor of Montana Stan Stephens declined to seek re-election in 1992, Bradley ran to succeed him. She won a close and competitive Democratic primary against Mike McGrath and Frank B. Morrison, Jr., and advanced to the general election, where she faced State Attorney General Marc Racicot. She was narrowly defeated by Racicot.

Electoral history

1992

References

1947 births
20th-century American politicians
20th-century American women politicians
American University alumni
Candidates in the 1978 United States elections
Candidates in the 1992 United States elections
Colorado College alumni
Living people
Democratic Party members of the Montana House of Representatives
Politicians from Bozeman, Montana
Politicians from Madison, Wisconsin
Women state legislators in Montana
21st-century American women